Procambarus econfinae, sometimes called the Panama City crayfish, is a species of crayfish in the family Cambaridae. It is only found around Panama City, Florida, and is listed as an endangered species on the IUCN Red List.

References

Cambaridae
Endemic fauna of Florida
Freshwater crustaceans of North America
Crustaceans described in 1942
Taxa named by Horton H. Hobbs Jr.
Taxonomy articles created by Polbot